The Saint Nicholas Church is a Russian Orthodox church in Shakhty, Rostov Oblast, Russia.

History
In 1902, at the initiative of the inhabitants of Ayutinsky settlement a church dedicated to St. Nicholas was built. In 1903 it was consecrated. The church had one altar, three domes and a bell tower:

On November 3, in Vlasovo-Ayutinsky khutor the consecration festives took place. 

After the Russian Revolution, the church was closed, but not destroyed, as country club was opened inside it. Only in 1991 did the renovated St. Nicholas Church resume its functioning. The new church has five domes, which in 2012 were consecrated by Bishop Ignatius.

References

Churches in Rostov Oblast
Churches completed in 1902
1902 establishments in the Russian Empire
Christian organizations established in 1902
Russian Orthodox church buildings in Russia
Cultural heritage monuments in Rostov Oblast